Tisens is a comune (municipality) in South Tyrol in northern Italy, located about  northwest of the city of Bolzano.

The commune is home to Katzenzungen Castle which harbors a 350+ year old vine of the Italian wine grape variety Versoaln that is considered one of the world's oldest and largest single grapevines in existence.

Geography

The municipality of Tisens contains the frazioni (subdivisions, mainly villages and hamlets) Gfrill (Caprile), Grissian (Grissiano), Naraun (Narano), Platzers (Plazzoles), Prissian (Prissiano), and Schernag.

Tisens borders the following municipalities: Gargazon, Lana, Nals, St. Pankraz, and Unsere Liebe Frau im Walde-St. Felix.

History

Coat-of-arms
The shield is quartering of argent and gules; in the first and fourth part is a rose gules, in the second and third a sable erect bear. It is the coat of Family Frank who managed the village from 1551 until 1743. The emblem was granted in 1966.

Society

Linguistic distribution
According to the 2011 census, 97.71% of the population speak German, 1.96% Italian and 0.34% Ladin as first language.

Demographic evolution

References

External links
 Homepage of the municipality
 Tourist Information Tisens Prissian

Municipalities of South Tyrol